Anthony P. Vainieri (born February 15, 1928) is an American Democratic Party politician who served in the New Jersey General Assembly from the 32nd Legislative District from 1984 to 1986.

Owner of the Vainieri Funeral Home in North Bergen, he attended Memorial High School in West New York and enlisted in the United States Navy. He served on the North Bergen Board of Commissioners from 1971 to 1975 and was elected to the Assembly in 1983. However, after one term, he and fellow incumbent running mate Paul Cuprowski were both defeated by Republicans Charles J. Catrillo and Frank J. Gargiulo in the wake of Thomas Kean's landslide gubernatorial win.

He was married to the former Natalie Agresta from 1952 until her death in 2017. They had four children including Hudson County Commissioner Anthony Vainieri Jr. and Assemblywoman Valerie Vainieri Huttle. Anthony Jr. and Valerie are now co-owners of the family's funeral home.

References

1928 births
Living people
Democratic Party members of the New Jersey General Assembly
People from McKees Rocks, Pennsylvania
People from North Bergen, New Jersey
United States Navy sailors
New Jersey city council members
American funeral directors
Memorial High School (West New York, New Jersey) alumni